Nationality words link to articles with information on the nation's poetry or literature (for instance, Irish or France).

Events
 American poet Jane Greer launches Plains Poetry Journal, an advance guard of the New Formalism movement.
 Final issue of L=A=N=G=U=A=G=E magazine published in the United States.
 First issue of Conjunctions literary journal published in the United States.
 This year, "the word 'Martianism' comes into use, through the verse of Craig Raine and his associates, presenting a vision of life on Earth as seen by a visiting Martian," the 1982 Britannica Book of the Year reports (p. 504). Some note that "Martianism" is an anagram for one of Raine's associates, Martin Amis.

Works published in English
Listed by nation where the work was first published and again by the poet's native land, if different; substantially revised works listed separately:

Australia
 R. Hall, editor, Collins Book of Australian Poetry, anthology
 H. Heseltine, editor, Penguin Book of Modern Australian Verse, anthology
 L. Kramer, Oxford History of Australian Literature (scholarship)
 Jennifer Maiden, For The Left Hand, South Head

Canada
 Margaret Atwood, True Stories
 Alfred Bailey, Miramichi Lightning: The Collected Poems.
 Roo Borson, A Sad Device,  American-Canadian
 Louis Dudek, Continuation I. Montréal: Véhicule Press, 1981.
 Louis Dudek, Poems from Atlantis. Ottawa: Golden Dog, 1981.
 Robert Finch, Has and Is.
 Gwen Hauser, Gophers and Swans
 George Johnston:
Auk Redivivus: Selected Poems
Rocky Shores.
 Irving Layton, Europe And Other Bad News. Toronto: McClelland and Stewart.
 Dorothy Livesay, The Raw Edges: Voices from Our Time. Winnipeg: Turnstone Press.
 Gwendolyn MacEwen, Trojan Women. 1981.
 Jay Macpherson, Poems Twice Told: The Boatman & Welcoming Disaster. Toronto: Oxford University Press.
Anne Marriott:
This West Shore, Toronto: League of Canadian Poets.
The Circular Coast: Poems New and Selected, Oakville, ON: Mosaic Press.
 George McWhirter, The Island Man
 P. K. Page, Evening Dance of the Grey Flies, poetry and prose
 Stephen Scobie, A Grand Memory For Forgetting
 Stephen Scobie and Douglas Barbour:
 The Pirates of Pen's Chance: Homolinguistic Translations
 The Maple Laugh Forever: An Anthology of Canadian Comic Poetry (Edmonton: Hurtig Publishers)
 F. R. Scott, The Collected Poems of F. R. Scott. Toronto: McClelland and Stewart. Governor General's Award 1981.
 Raymond Souster, Collected Poems of Raymond Souster, Volume Two, 1955-62

India, in English
 Keki N. Daruwalla, Winter Poems ( Poetry in English ), Bombay: Allied Publishers.
 Jayanta Mahapatra, Relationship ( Poetry in English ), winner of the Central Sahitya Akademi Awardin 1982; Cuttack: Chandrabhaga Society
 Pritish Nandy, editor, Indian Poetry in English Today, New Delhi: Sterling Publication Pvt. Ltd.

Ireland
 Dermot Bolger, Finglas Lilies
 Eiléan Ní Chuilleanáin: The Rose Geranium, Dublin: The Gallery Press
 Seamus Heaney, Selected Poems 1965-1975, Faber & Faber, Northern Ireland native published in the United Kingdom
 Michael Longley, Patchwork, Irish poet published in the United Kingdom
 Thomas McCarthy, The Sorrow Garden, Anvil Press, London, Irish poet published in the United Kingdom
 Derek Mahon:
 Courtyards in Delft. Gallery Press
 The Hunt by Night
 Christopher Nolan, Dam-Burst of Dreams

United Kingdom
 Dannie Abse, Way Out in the Centre
 Sir John Betjeman, Church Poems
 Alison Brackenbury, Dreams of Power
 Roberta Berke, Bounds out of Bounds: A Compass for Recent American and British Poetry, Oxford University Press, criticism
 Douglas Dunn, St. Kilda's Parliament
 D. J. Enright, Collected Poems
 James Fenton, Dead Soldiers, Sycamore Press,
 Roy Fisher, Consolidated Comedies
 Thom Gunn, Talbot Road
 Tony Harrison:
 Continuous
 A Kumquat for John Keats
 Seamus Heaney, Selected Poems 1965-1975, Faber & Faber, Northern Ireland native published in the United Kingdom
 John Heath-Stubbs:
 Buzz Buzz
 Editor, Selected Poems of Thomas Gray
 Ted Hughes:
 Under the North Star
 Editor, Collected Poems by Sylvia Plath (see Plath, below)
 Peter Levi, Private Ground
 Liz Lochhead, The Grimm Sisters
 Christopher Logue, Ode to the Dodo
 Michael Longley, Patchwork, Irish poet published in the United Kingdom
 Derek Mahon:
 Courtyards in Delft. Gallery Press
 The Hunt by Night
 Andrew Motion, Independence
 Norman Nicholson, Sea to the West
 Brian Patten, Love Poems
 Tom Paulin, The Book of Juniper
 Sylvia Plath, Collected Poems, posthumous, containing 224 poems in chronological order, edited by Ted Hughes; poems by an American, edited by her English husband
 Peter Porter, English Subtitles
 Peter Reading, Tom O'Bedlam's Beauties
 Peter Redgrove, The Apple Broadcast, and Other New Poems
 Carol Rumens, Unplayed Music
 Elizabeth Smart, Ten Poems
 D. M. Thomas, Dreaming in Bronze
 R. S. Thomas, Between Here and Now
 The Faber Book of Christian Verse

United States
 A.R. Ammons, A Coast of Trees
 John Ashbery, Shadow Train
 Imamu Amiri Baraka, formerly "LeRoi Jones", Reggae or Not!
 Ted Berrigan, In a Blue River
 Robert Bly, The Man in the Black Coat Turns
 Paul Bowles, Next to Nothing: Collected Poems 1926–1977
 Joseph Payne Brennan, Creep To Death
 Joseph Brodsky: Verses on the Winter Campaign 1980, translation by Alan Meyers. – London: Anvil Press Russian-American
 Gwendolyn Brooks:
 Black Love
 To Disembark
 Jared Carter, Work, for the Night Is Coming
 Gregory Corso, Herald of the Autochthonic Spirit, his first collection in 11 years
 Peter Davison, Barn Fever and Other Poems
 Lawrence Ferlinghetti, Endless Life: Selected Poems
 Carolyn Forche, The Country Between Us
 Daryl Hine, Selected Poems
 John Hollander:
 Rhyme's Reason: A Guide to English Verse, poetry
 The Figure of Echo
 Janet Kauffman, The Weather Book
 Denise Levertov, Light Up the Cave
 Philip Levine, One for the Rose
 Frederick Morgan, Northbook
 Michael Palmer, Notes For Echo Lake (North Point Press)
 Sylvia Plath, The Collected Poems of Sylvia Plath, Ted Hughes, editor, containing 224 poems in chronological order (posthumous)
 Marie Ponsot, Admit Impediment
 Michael Ryan, In Winter (Holt)
 Anne Sexton, The Complete Poems, published posthumously (died 1974)
 Leslie Marmon Silko, Storyteller,  short stories, poems and photographs
 Shel Silverstein, A Light in the Attic a collection of children's poetry
 Gilbert Sorrentino, Selected Poems 1958-1980
 Gerald Stern, The Red Coal
 Robert Stone, A Flag for Sunrise
 Mark Strand, The Planet of Lost Things
 Richard L. Tierney, Collected Poems
 Michael Van Walleghen, More Trouble With the Obvious
 David Wagoner, Landfall
 Rosmarie Waldrop, Nothing Has Changed (Awede Press)
 Diane Wakoski, The Magician's Feastletters
 Robert Penn Warren, Rumor Verified: Poems 1979-1980
 Richard Wilbur, Seven Poems
 Nancy Willard, A Visit to William Blake's Inn, illustrated by Alice and Martin Provensen

Criticism, scholarship and biography in the United States
 Colin Robert Chase, The Dating of Beowulf
 John Hollander:
 Rhyme's Reason: A Guide to English Verse, criticism
 The Figure of Echo, criticism

Other in English
 Alistair Campbell, Collected Poems, Hazard, New Zealand
 C. K. Stead, In the Glass Case, criticism, New Zealand

Works published in other languages
Listed by language and often by nation where the work was first published and again by the poet's native land, if different; substantially revised works listed separately:

Denmark
 Inger Christensen, Alphabet (Alfabet), translated into English by Susanna Nied in 2001
 Klaus Høeck:
 Canzone, publisher: Gyldendal 
 Sorte sonetter, publisher: Gyldendal 
 Søren Ulrik Thomsen, City Slang

French language

Canada, in French
 Pierre Nepveu, editor, La poésie québécoise, des origines à nos jours, en collaboration avec Laurent Mailhot, Montréal: Presses de l'Université du Québec/l'Hexagone, anthology
 Madeleine Ouellette-Michalska, Entre le souffle et l'aine, Saint-Lambert: Le Noroît
 Jean Royer, L'intime soif, Montréal: Éditions du silence

France
 Alain Bosquet:
 Poèmes, deux
 Sonnets pour une fin de siècle
 Jean Cayrol, Poésie-Journal
 Michel Deguy, Donnant Donnant
 Emmanuel Hocquard, Une ville ou une petite ile
 Abdellatif Laabi, Sous le bâillon le poème. L'Harmattan, Paris, Moroccan author writing in and published in France
 Charles le Quintrec, La Lumière et l'argile
 Jacques Roubaud, Dors
 Jacques Roubaud and Florence Delay, Merlin l'enchanteur

German
 Christoph Buchwald, general editor, and Rolf Haufs, guest editor, Jahrbuch der Lyrik 3 ("Poetry Yearbook 3"), publisher: Claassen; anthology
 V. Hage, editor, Lyrik für Leser: Deutsche Gedichte der siebziger Jahre, anthology
 Heinz Toni Hamm, Poesie und kommunikative Praxis (scholarship)
 Klaus Weissenberger, editor, Die deutsche Lyrik, 1945-1975 (scholarship)

Hebrew
 A. Hillel, Devareiy
 Gabriel Preil, a new collection
 Avot Yeshurun, a new collection
 S. Shalom, a new collection
 Yehuda Amichai, Shalva gedola, she'elot uteshuvot
 Robert Whitehill, Efes Makom ("No Place"), published in Israel
 Peretz Banai, a "new poet"
 Esther Ettinger, a "new poet"
 Yosef Yehezkel, a "new poet"
 Aharon Shabtai, Xut ("Thread")
 Mordecai Geldman, a new collection
 Hannah Barzilai, a new collection
 Batsheva Sharif, a new collection
 Michael Senunit, a new collection
 Menachem Ben, a new collection

Hungary
 György Petri, Örökhétfő

India
Listed in alphabetical order by first name:
 Hari Daryani, Amar Gitu, a verse translation into Sindhi of (and commentary on) the Gita
 K. G. Sankara Pillai, Kavitha, Thiruvananthapuram, Kerala: Kerala Kavita; Malayalam-language
 K. Satchidanandan, Peedana Kalam, ("Times of Torment"); Malayalam-language
 Namdeo Dhasal; Marathi-language:
 Tuhi Iyatta Kanchi?, Mumbai: Ambedkara Prabodhini
 Ambedkari Chalwal, Mumbai: Ambedkara Prabodhini
 Nilmani Phookan, Gacia Larkar Kavita, Guwahati, Assam: Bani Prakash, Assamese-language
 Nirendranath Chakravarti, Pagla Ghonti, Kolkata: Dey’s Publishing; Bengali-language
 Parsram Rohra "Nimano", Sindhi-language
 Pritish Nandy and Shakti Chattopadhyay, Pritisa Nandira kabita, Kalikata: Ananda Pabalisarsa
 Rajendra Kishore Panda, Choukathhare Chirakala, Cuttack: Friends Publishers, Oraya-language
 Rituraj, Pul aur Pani, New Delhi: Rajkamal Prakashan; Hindi-language
 Umashankur Joshi, Gujarati-language:
 Dharavastra
 Saptapadi
 Vinod Kumar Shukla, Vah Aadmi Chala Gaya Naya Garam Coat Pehankar Vichar Ki Tarah, Hapur: Sambhavna Prakashan; Hindi-language
 Udaya Narayana Singh, Anuttaran, Calcutta: Mithila Darshan, Maithili-language
 Mehr Lal Soni Zia Fatehabadi, Rang-o-Noor (The Colour and the Light) - published by R.K.Sehgal, Bazm-e-Seemab, New Delhi, Urdu

Italy
 Eugenio Montale, L'opera in versi
 Carlo Betocchi, Poesie del sabato
 Eugenio Montale, Altri verse e poesie disperse (originally published in 1980 under the title L'opera in versi), Milan: Arnaldo Mondadore Editore; Italy
 Maria Luisa Spaziani, Geometria del disordine
 Giovanni Guidici, Il ristorante dei morti
 Amelia Rosselli:
 Primi scritti 1952-1965
 Impromptu

Poland
 Stanisław Barańczak, Ksiazki najgorsze 1975-1980 ("The Worst Books"), criticism; Kraków: KOS
 T. Kostkiewiczowa and Z. Goliński, editors, Swiat polprawiac—zuchwate rzemiosto, anthology
 Ryszard Krynicki,  ("Not Much More. Poems From the Notebook 78-79"); Kraków: Cracowska Oficyna Studentow
 Ewa Lipska, Poezje wybrane ("Selected Poems"), Warszawa: LSW
 Bronisław Maj, Taka wolność. Wiersze z lat 1971-1975 ("Such Freedom: Poems, 1971-1975"); Warsaw: MAW
 Piotr Sommer, Przed snem

Portuguese language

Portugal
 Herberto Helder, Poesia Toda
 A. Pinheiro Torre, O Ressentimento dum Ocidental

Brazil
 Carlos Drummond de Andrade, A paixão medida
 João Cabral de Melo Neto, A escola das faces
 Adélia Prado, Terra de Santa Cruz
 Mário da Silva, several volumes of poetry

Spanish language

Spain
 Antonio Abad, Misericor de mí
 Matilde Camus:
 He seguido tus huellas ("I have followed your footprints")
 Testigo de tu marcha ("Witness of your departure")
 Concha Lagos, Teoría de la inseguridad
 Vincente Presa, Teoría de los límites
 Pablo Virumbrales, Cancionero del vaso

Latin America
 Mario Benedetti, Viento del exilio ("Air From Exile"), Uruguay

Swedish
 Karl Vennberg, Bilder I-XXVI
 Goran Sonnevi, Små klanger; en rőst
 Eva Runefelt, Augusti

Yiddish

Criticism, scholarship and biography in Yiddish
 Itskhak Janoswicz, Avrom Sutzkever, His Poetry and Prose
 The Lexicon of Modern Yiddish Literature, the eighth and final volume
 Khaim Leyb Fuks, Biographical Dictionary of Hebrew and Yiddish Writers in Canada

Other
 Chen Kehua, Qijing shaonian ("Whale Boy") Chinese (Taiwan)
 Rita Kelly, Dialann sa Díseart, Ireland
 Luo Fu, Wound of Time, Chinese (Taiwan) 
 Stein Mehren, Den usynlige regnbuen, Norway
 Alexander Mezhirov, Selected Works, two volumes, Russia, Soviet Union
 Nuala Ní Dhomhnaill, An dealg Droighin, including "Sceala" and "Failte Bheal na Sionna don Iasc", Gaelic-language, Ireland
 Nizar Qabbani, Syrian poet writing in Arabic:
 I Write the History of Woman Like So
 The Lover's Dictionary

Awards and honors

Australia
 Kenneth Slessor Prize for Poetry: Alan Gould, Astral Sea

Canada
 Gerald Lampert Award: Elizabeth Allan, The Shored Up House
 1981 Governor General's Awards: F. R. Scott, The Collected Poems of F. R. Scott (English); Michel Beaulieu, Visages (French)
 Pat Lowther Award: M. Travis Lane, Divinations and Short Poems 1973–1978
 Prix Émile-Nelligan: Jean-Yves Collette, La Mort d’André Breton

United Kingdom
 Cholmondeley Award: Roy Fisher, Robert Garioch, Charles Boyle
 Eric Gregory Award: Alan Jenkins, Simon Rae, Marion Lomax, Philip Gross, Kathleen Jamie, Mark Abley, Roger Crowley, Ian Gregson
 Queen's Gold Medal for Poetry: D. J. Enright
 Hawthornden Prize: Christopher Reid

United States
 Agnes Lynch Starrett Poetry Prize: Kathy Callaway, Heart of the Garfish
 AML Award for poetry to Robert A. Rees for "Gilead"
 Bernard F. Connors Prize for Poetry: Frank Bidart, "The War of Vaslav Nijinsky"
 Bollingen Prize (United States): Howard Nemerov and May Swenson
 Consultant in Poetry to the Library of Congress (later the post would be called "Poet Laureate Consultant in Poetry to the Library of Congress"): Maxine Kumin appointed this year.
 MacArthur Fellowships: A.R. Ammons, Joseph Brodsky, Robert Penn Warren
 National Book Award for poetry (United States): Lisel Mueller, The Need to Hold Still
 National Book Critics Circle Award for Poetry: A.R. Ammons, A Coast of Trees (Norton)
 Poet Laureate Consultant in Poetry to the Library of Congress: Maxine Kumin appointed
 Pulitzer Prize for Poetry: James Schuyler: The Morning of the Poem
 Fellowship of the Academy of American Poets: Richard Hugo
 Walt Whitman Award: Alberto Ríos, Whispering to Fool the Wind (Sheep Meadow Press) Judge: Donald Justice

Births
 April 6 – Marie Šťastná, Czech poet
 Emily Berry, English poet
 Yirgalem Fisseha Mebrahtu, Eritrean poet
 Doireann Ní Ghríofa, Irish-language poet

Deaths
Birth years link to the corresponding "[year] in poetry" article:
 January 29 – John Glassco (born 1909), Canadian poet, memoirist and novelist
 February 23 – Nan Shepherd (born 1893), Scottish novelist and poet
 March 15 – Horiguchi Daigaku 堀口 大学 (born 1892), Japanese, Taishō and Shōwa period poet and translator of French literature; a member of the Shinshisha ("The New Poetry Society"); accompanied his father on overseas diplomatic postings
 April 25 – Takis Sinopoulos (born 1917), Greek
 April 26 – Robert Garioch (born 1909), Scots language Scottish poet and translator
 April 29 – Leonard Mann (born 1895), Australian
 April 30 – Peter Huchel (born 1903), German
 May 8 – Uri Zvi Grinberg (born 1896), Jewish
 May 31 – Falguni Ray (born 1945), Bengali poet and youngest member of Hungryalism movement
 August 19 – Badawi al-Jabal (born 1905 or 1907), Syrian Arab
 August 27 – James Larkin Pearson (born 1879), American poet, newspaper publisher; North Carolina Poet Laureate, 1953–1981
 September 12 – Eugenio Montale, 85, Italian poet, prose writer, editor and translator, winner of the Nobel Prize for Literature in 1975 
 October 26 – Marie Uguay, 26  (born 1955), French-Canadian), from bone cancer
 October 30 – Georges Brassens (born 1921), French singer-songwriter and poet  
 November 14 – Anton Podbevšek (born 1898), Slovene avant-garde poet
 Also:
 Adolf Beiss (born 1900), German
 Ada Verdun Howell (born 1902), Australian

See also

 Poetry
 List of years in poetry
 List of poetry awards

Notes

 Britannica Book of the Year 1982 ("for events of 1981"), published by Encyclopædia Britannica 1982 (source of many items in "Works published" section and rarely in other sections)

20th-century poetry
Poetry